Archbishop Kyprianos of Cyprus was the head of the Cypriot Orthodox Church in the early 19th century at the time that the Greek War of Independence broke out.

Kyprianos was born in (the then village of) Strovolos in 1756. He served as a monk in Machairas monastery until 1783 when he left for Wallachia for further theological studies returning to Cyprus in 1802. He became archbishop of Cyprus in 1810. He founded the Pancyprian Gymnasium (originally called the Hellenic School) in 1812 which was the first secondary school on the island and which is still located opposite the archbishopric in Nicosia.

In 1818, Kyprianos was initiated into the Friendly Society (Philiki Etairia) which was preparing the ground for war and liberation from the Ottoman Empire. In 1820, Alexander Ypsilantis contacted the archbishop asking for Cyprus to join in the armed struggle. Kyprianos' reply was pragmatic: He suggested that Cyprus support the upcoming revolution with money and supplies as any armed struggle was bound to  end in disaster. Cyprus, being an isolated island far from Greece, had no substantial navy and no tradition of Klepht warfare like other parts of the Greek world.

However, when the Greek War of Independence broke out on 25 March 1821, Cypriots left in large numbers to fight in Greece, while proclamations were distributed in every corner of the island. The local pasha, Küçük Mehmet, reacted with fury, calling in reinforcements, confiscating weapons and arresting several prominent Cypriots. Archbishop Kyprianos was urged (by his friends) to leave the island as the situation worsened but refused to do so. Finally, on 9 July 1821 Küçük Mehmet had the gates to the walled city of Nicosia closed and executed, by beheading or hanging, 470 important Cypriots amongst them Chrysanthos (bishop of Paphos), Meletios (bishop of Kition) and Lavrentios (bishop of Kyrenia). Archbishop Kyprianos was publicly hanged from a tree opposite the former palace of the Lusignan Kings of Cyprus. The events leading up to his execution were documented in an epic poem written in the Cypriot dialect by Vassilis Michaelides.

Kyprianos was outspoken on the issue of Freemasonry which he condemned.

Archbishop Kyprianos and the bishops Chrysanthos, Meletios and Lavrentios were buried in the crypt of the monument at the Faneromeni Church, Nicosia.

See also
New-martyr

References

1756 births
1821 deaths
Executed priests
Archbishops of Cyprus
Greek Cypriot people
Greek people of the Greek War of Independence
People from Nicosia
Eastern Orthodox Christians from Cyprus
Executed Cypriot people
People executed by the Ottoman Empire by hanging
19th-century executions by the Ottoman Empire
Members of the Filiki Eteria